Loyal to the Game is the ninth studio album and fifth posthumous studio album by American rapper Tupac Shakur. The album was produced by Eminem and consists of remixes of previously unreleased music recorded by Tupac before his death in 1996. Released in the United States on December 14, 2004, Loyal to the Game debuted at number one on the US Billboard 200 chart. It was later certified Platinum by the Recording Industry Association of America (RIAA).

Background 
During an interview with MTV, Eminem stated he was so moved by Tupac's life and work that he wrote a letter to Tupac's mother, Afeni Shakur, asking her to consider letting him produce his next album. Shakur agreed, allowing Eminem to produce three new songs for the 2003 soundtrack album, Tupac: Resurrection, and the entirety of Loyal to the Game, bar bonus content.

All songs on the album were recorded prior to Tupac's involvement in the controversial East Coast-West Coast hip hop rivalry, serving as the second posthumous album released consisting of material from this time period, the first being 1997's R U Still Down? (Remember Me). Although the songs are mostly unreleased, the title track, "Loyal to the Game", was previously released on the cassette edition of the 1994 soundtrack album Above the Rim, and subsequently as the B-side to the album's lead single, "Regulate".

The album featured two singles:  "Thugs Get Lonely Too", which served as a promotional single for the album, and "Ghetto Gospel", which served as the lead single. Originally, "Ghetto Gospel" was recorded for inclusion on the 1992 Christmas compilation A Very Special Christmas 2, but due to Tupac's legal troubles, the song was dropped from the album. This original version has a much faster tempo and features a third and fourth verse which didn't feature in Eminem's remix.

Production 
Loyal to the Game marks the only posthumous Tupac album not to feature any original production. When remixing these songs, Eminem used various unusual production techniques, namely, modifying the pace and pitch of Tupac's voice to better suit the instrumentals he produced. The style of the production on the album fitted more to the form of a Shady/Aftermath release, of which Eminem partly created, than it did to any original or previous posthumous Tupac release. There were also various uses of cutting and pasting vocals to produce new words synonymous with rap culture at that time, such as making it sound as though Tupac is saying, "2005", "G-Unit", "Obie Trice" and "Em".

Although Loyal to the Game was produced by Eminem, the album does feature four bonus remixes, with production coming from Scott Storch, Red Spyda, Raphael Saadiq, and DJ Quik, though, the bonus track produced by Scott Storch, "Po Nigga Blues", does not feature in Eminem form on the main album. It is unknown if Eminem did or did not produce a version of that song.

Critical reception and commercial performance 

Loyal to the Game debuted at number one on the US Billboard 200 chart, with first-week-sales of over 330,000 copies in its first week. On February 15, 2005, the album was certified platinum by the Recording Industry Association of America (RIAA) for sales of over a million copies in the US. As of September 2011, the album has sold 1,204,124 copies in the United States.

Track listing 

Sample credits
"Ghetto Gospel" contains a sample of "Indian Sunset" performed by Elton John.
"Don't You Trust Me?" contains a sample of "Do You Have a Little Time" performed by Dido.
"N.I.G.G.A." contains a sample of "(Don't Worry) If There's a Hell Below, We're All Going to Go" performed by Curtis Mayfield.

Notes
Originally, "Out on Bail" was intended for an unreleased version of Thug Life: Volume 1 but due to controversial reasons, the original version did not make the final cut and was remixed after Eminem went on board. The original version can be found on YouTube.

Charts

Weekly charts

Year-end charts

Certifications

Release history

References 

2004 albums
Albums produced by Raphael Saadiq
Albums produced by Eminem
Albums produced by Scott Storch
Albums published posthumously
Tupac Shakur albums
Albums produced by DJ Quik
Amaru Entertainment albums